Breakneck is an English adjective meaning dangerous or reckless. It may refer to:

 Breakneck Creek, a tributary of Connoquenessing Creek in western Pennsylvania
 Breakneck Hill, in Allegany County, Maryland
 Breakneck Ridge, a mountain along the Hudson River, New York
 Breakneck Ridge (Metro-North station), a station on the Metro-North Railroad in New York State
 Breakneck (video game) or N.I.C.E. 2, a 1998 video game

See also
 "Break Ya Neck", a single by American rapper Busta Rhymes from his 2001 album Genesis